Frederick Luis Aldama is an American academic, known for this work as the Jacob & Frances Sanger Mossiker Chair in the Humanities, founder and director of the Latinx Pop Lab, and Affiliate Faculty in Radio-TV-Film at the University of Texas, Austin, and Adjunct Professor & Distinguished University Professor at The Ohio State University. He teaches courses on Latinx comics, tv, and film in the departments of English and Radio-Television-Film. At the Ohio State University he was Distinguished University Professor, Arts & Humanities Distinguished Professor of English, University Distinguished Scholar, and Alumni Distinguished Teacher as well as recipient of the Rodica C. Botoman Award for Distinguished Teaching and Mentoring and the Susan M. Hartmann Mentoring and Leadership Award. At the Ohio State University he was founder and director of the award-winning LASER/Latinx Space for Enrichment Research and founder and co-director of the Humanities & Cognitive Sciences High School Summer Institute. Aldama is the creator and curator of the Planetary Republic of Comics.

Early life and education
Aldama was born in Mexico City to a Guatemalan- and Irish-American mother from Los Angeles and a Mexican father from Mexico City. When he was a child, his mother moved the family to California. He received his undergraduate degree  in English from the University of California, Berkeley in 1992 and obtained his PhD from Stanford University in 1999.

Career
Aldama is an author of fiction and comics as well as a scholar and professor who uses insights from narrative theory, cognitive science, and Latinx critical cultural theory to enrich understanding of the creation, distribution, and consumption of Latinx pop cultural phenomena, especially comic books, TV, and film. 

He is book series editor of the Latinx and Latin American Profiles  (with the University of Pittsburgh Press) that publishes scholarship on innovative Latinx cultural figures, such as Reading Junot Diaz and Poets, Philosophers, Lovers: On the Writings of Giannina Braschi. He also edits the Global Media & Race and Critical Graphics series (with Rutgers University Press). He co-edits Latinx Pop Culture (for University of Arizona Press) as well as the World Comics and Graphic Nonfiction series (for the University of Texas Press). Aldama edits Latinographix, a comic books series that showcases graphic novels, memoir, and nonfiction by Latinx writers and artists, including Tales from la Vida: A Latinx Comics Anthology and United States of Banana: A Graphic Novel by Giannina Braschi and Joakim Lindengren.

In 2017, Aldama published his first book of fiction, Long Stories Cut Short: Fictions from the Borderlands. His flash fiction style depicts marginalized Latinx lives on both sides of the US/Mexico border. He is the author of the children's books, With Papá and The Adventures of Charlie the Chupacabra. He produced the first documentary film on the history of Latinx superheroes in mainstream comics. He co-founded and directed of SÕL-CON: The Brown, Black, & Indigenous Comics Expo. He is founder and director of the Latinx Pop Lab BIPOC Comics & Multimedia Arts Expo & Symposium at UT Austin--the nation's only collegiate comic book expo that focuses on the work of BIPOC scholars, artists, writers, editors, filmmakers, and illustrators. He served on the executive council of the International Society for the Study of Narrative from 2013 to 2015, and serves on the advisory boards for journals such as Narrative, INKS: The Journal of Comics Society, MELUS, and Journal of Narrative Theory. He is a member of the board for the Oxford Bibliographies in Latino Studies. He is an associate editor of American Book Review and judge for the TIL/Texas Institute of Letters.

Essays and interviews 
Aldama's articles, reviews, and interviews have appeared in Aztlán, College Literature, Poets & Writers, World Literature Today, Cross Cultural Poetics, Lit: Literature Interpretation Theory, Lucero, Comparative Literature, The Callaloo Journal, Nepantla, Journal of Interdisciplinary Literary Analysis, American Literature, Latin American Research Review, Modern Fiction Studies, Modern Drama, SubStance, Style, ImageTexT, Latino Studies Projections: The Journal of Movies and Mind, Alter/nativas: Latin American Cultural Studies Journal, and Journal of the West. Interviews with Aldama have appeared in ABC News, PBS, Fox News Latino, CNN, VOXXI, MSNBC, Telemundo, The Washington Post, the New York Times, the LARB, and Channel 10 news.

Selected awards 
 2018–2019 Susan M. Hartmann Mentoring and Leadership Award
 2018–2019 Rodica C. Botoman Award for Distinguished Undergraduate Teaching and Mentoring
 2018 Eisner Award for Best Academic/Scholarly Work for Latinx Superheroes in Mainstream Comics
 2018 International Latino Book Award for Best Nonfiction
 2017 Alumni Award for Distinguished Teaching and inducted into the Academy of Teaching
 2016 American Association of Hispanics in Higher Education's Outstanding Latino/a Faculty Award
 2016 Ohio Education Summit Award
 2015 White House "Hispanic Education Bright Spot" Award for founding and directing LASER 
 2014 Arts and Humanities Distinguished Professor
 2014 University Emerging Community Engagement Award
 2008 University Distinguished Diversity Enhancement Award
 2004 MLA Award: Outstanding Scholarly Book Chicano/Latino Studies for Dancing with Ghosts: A Critical Biography of Arturo Islas 
 1999 Ford Foundation Fellowship

Books published

As author
 
 
 
 
 
 
 
 
 
 
 
 
 
 
 
 
 
 
 
 
 
 
 
Las aventuras de Chupacabra Charlie. Latinographix. Illustrations by Chris Escobar. Translation by Sonia Rodríguez Salazar. Columbus, OH: Mad Creek Books, August 2021. ISBN 978-0-8142-5801-9.

As editor
 
 
 
 
 
 
 
 
 
 
 
 
 
 
 
 
 
 
Aldama, Frederick Luis; O'Dwyer, Tess; and Stavans, Ilan. Poets, Philosophers, Lovers: On the Writings of Giannina Braschi. (Latinx and Latin American Profiles) Pittsburgh, PA: University of Pittsburgh Press. October 2020. 9780822946182.
 United States of Banana: A Graphic Novel by Giannina Braschi and Joakim Lindengren. Introduction: Smith, Amanda M.; Sheeran, Amy. Columbus, OH: The Ohio State University Press. 2021.

References

1969 births
American academics of English literature
Living people
UC Berkeley College of Letters and Science alumni
Stanford University alumni
Ohio State University faculty
Comic book editors
Book editors